Nephtyidae is a family of polychaete worms. They are commonly referred to as catworms.

Characteristics
Nephtyidae are pale, clearly segmented polychaetes with a small pentagonal prostomium with two pairs of small antennae. Their segments are little differentiated and have a rectangular cross-section. Nephtyids are active predators, with a strong muscular proboscis, armed with two well developed jaws.

They can dig relatively fast through sandy sediments. They can also swim with sinuous movements.

References 

Annelid families
Phyllodocida